Calcineurin subunit B type 2 is a protein that in humans is encoded by the PPP3R2 gene. Among its related pathways are MAPK signaling pathway and GPCR pathway. GO annotations related to this gene include calcium ion binding. An important paralog of this gene is CHP1.

References

Further reading

EF-hand-containing proteins